Sanguantang Bridge is a historic stone arch bridge in Luoxing Subdistrict, Jiashan County, Zhejiang, China.

History
The bridge was originally built in 1574, in the ruling of Wanli Emperor in the Ming dynasty (1368–1644). It name comes from a nearby temple named Sanguantang Temple. It was completely destroyed in 1860, during the reign of Xianfeng Emperor in the Qing dynasty (1644–1911). Eight years later, it was rebuilt in the original site. In December 1986, it was designated as a cultural relic protection unit at county level by the local government.

Architecture

References

Bridges in Zhejiang
Arch bridges in China
Qing dynasty architecture
Bridges completed in 1868
Buildings and structures completed in 1868